Kalleh-ye Nahr Mian (also Romanized as Kalleh-ye Nahr Mīān and Kalleh-ye Nahr Meyān; also known as Kalleh, Kūsa‘lī, Kūseh ‘Alī, Qalachi, and Qal‘eh-ye Nahr Mīān) is a village in Nahr-e Mian Rural District, Zalian District, Shazand County, Markazi Province, Iran. At the 2006 census, its population was 225, in 54 families.

References 

Populated places in Shazand County